Duncan's Creek Presbyterian Church, also known as Old Rock Church, is a historic Presbyterian church located near Clinton, Laurens County, South Carolina. It was built in 1842 and is a  simple rectangular building constructed of irregular stones. The church was founded by Scotch-Irish and Irish settlers and believed to be the oldest church in Laurens County.

It was added to the National Register of Historic Places in 1973.

References

Presbyterian churches in South Carolina
Churches on the National Register of Historic Places in South Carolina
Churches completed in 1842
19th-century Presbyterian church buildings in the United States
Churches in Laurens County, South Carolina
Scotch-Irish American culture in South Carolina
National Register of Historic Places in Laurens County, South Carolina
1842 establishments in South Carolina